Quickbrowse was a Web-based subscription service that enables users to browse multiple Web pages more quickly by combining them vertically into a single Web page. It was one of the early metabrowsing services.

History

Quickbrowse received wide media coverage during the height of the Dot-com bubble. It was quickly followed by other metabrowsers such as Octopus.com (backed by Netscape founder Marc Andreessen), Onepage.com (backed by Microsoft co-founder Paul Allen), iHarvest.com, Katiesoft.com and Calltheshots.com - all of which have ceased to operate as metabrowsers. Octopus received more than $11.4 million in venture capital funding from Redpoint Ventures. Onepage received $25 million in venture capital funding. Quickbrowse received half a million dollars in angel funding. Quickbrowse backers included its lead investor, Geocities.com founder David Bohnett, the financial writer Andrew Tobias and CBS hurricane expert Bryan Norcross. From 2001-2004, the Miami Herald licensed Quickbrowse and operated myHerald.com, a service that was based on the Quickbrowse approach of customizable Web content. Quickbrowse ceased operation in 2005. 

Quickbrowse was created by Marc Fest, a former journalist and self-taught programmer who initially created it as a tool to facilitate his daily journalist research.

References

External links
Marc Fest personal Web site

Software companies established in 1998